Jizan Region also spelled Jazan is the second smallest (after Al Bahah) region of Saudi Arabia.  It stretches  along the southern Red Sea coast, just north of Yemen. It covers an area of 11,671 km2 and has a population of 1,567,547 at the 2017 census. The region has the highest population density in the Kingdom. The capital is the city of Jazan; Prince Muhammad bin Nasser has been the Governor since April 2001.

The region includes over 100 islands in the Red Sea. Jazan Economic City is a mega project that is planned to boost the economy of the region and make it part of the Saudi economic growth. The Farasan Islands, Saudi Arabia's first conservation protected area, is home to migratory birds from Europe in winter.

Geography
The region divides into three parts.
 The Al-Sarawat mountains inland, which rise to about 3,000 metres.
 The Alhazoun forest district consists of forest broken by some areas of rich pasture.
 The plains are noted for the production of coffee beans, cereal grain crops (barley, millet and wheat) and fruit (apples, bananas, grapes, mangoes, papayas, plums and citrus varieties).

Though the climate on the highlands is similar to the relatively wetter climate of 'Asir, the coastal regions of Jizan province are part of Tihamah, probably the hottest place in the country, with mean maximum temperatures ranging from 40 °C (104 °F) in July to 31 °C (88 °F) in January. High humidity from coastal lagoons makes the climate even less bearable than it would be otherwise. Rainfall is extremely low at less than 75 millimetres (3 inches) per year. 
Sabya is located in the center between the mountain and the beach.

Population

Sub-divisions

The region is sub-divided into 14 governorates as follows:

Ethnography 

The Arabic language is spoken by over 90% of the inhabitants. Parts of Jizan was claimed to be part of Yemen by many Yemen. It was annexed by Saudi Arabia during the Saudi–Yemeni War (1934) and Imam Yahya suspended Yemen's claim to the region in the treaty of Taif. Though many Yemenis continued to claim Jizan until the issue was settled formally and finally in the Saudi-Yemeni border agreement of 2000.

Environmental projects 

In 2019, the Saudi Government allocated $213 million to implement water and environmental projects in the region. Such projects include, installing a sewage treatment line, sewage network, sewage connections for households, and a station for pumping.

References

Further reading
 S.I. Bruk, Narody Peredney Azii (1960).
 S.I. Bruk, and V. S. Apenchenko, Atlas Narodov Mira (Moscow: Academy of Science, 1964).
 A. Gabriel, Religionsgeographie von Persien (Vienna, 1971).

External links

 Official website 
 A travel through the province of Jizan, Splendid Arabia: A travel site with photos and routes

 
Provinces of Saudi Arabia